Johnny McPhillips (born 13 April 1997) is a professional rugby union player who plays for US Carcassonne in France's Pro D2, the second division.  Between 2019 and 2021 he played 21 times for Leicester Tigers and between 2017 and 2019 he made 22 appearances for Ulster.. He represented Ireland U20 as fly-half as the side made the Junior World Cup Final in 2016.

Career

McPhillips was born in Newcastle upon Tyne, England, and was a pupil at Sedbergh School.  McPhilips signed for Ulster in 2016. After four appearances from the bench, he scored his first try on his first start on 9 February 2018.

On 21 June 2019 McPhillips returned to England and signed for Leicester Tigers.  He played 21 times for the club over his two years, scoring 71 points.  On 10 June 2021 his signing was announced by US Carcassonne.

References

External links
Ulster Rugby Profile

1997 births
Living people
Irish rugby union players
Rugby union fly-halves
Ulster Rugby players
Leicester Tigers players
US Carcassonne players
Rugby union players from Newcastle upon Tyne